Coats of arms of US Army units are heraldic emblems associated with units in the US Army. Under Army Regulation 840-10, each regiment and separate table of organization and equipment (TOE) battalion of the US Army is authorized a coat of arms to be displayed on the organization's flag, called the "colors." This coat of arms usually forms the basis for the unit's distinctive unit insignia (DUI), the emblem worn by all members of the unit on their service uniforms.

Below are galleries of the coats of arms of miscellaneous US Army units not included elsewhere. The official mottoes (as awarded by The Institute of Heraldry of the U.S. Army) and/or special designations (as awarded by the United States Army Center of Military History) of the units are also noted.

Military Intelligence

Military police

Signal

Special operations

Support

Non-specified regiments

Sources & references 

United States military coats of arms
Army